Leeming is a southern suburb of Perth, Western Australia. It is divided between the three local government areas of the City of Melville, the City of Cockburn (south) and the City of Canning (north-east).

History
The area was previously part of Jandakot and was predominantly agricultural until the 1970s, having been laid out by surveyor George Waters Leeming (1857–1902) in 1886. Three roadsKing Road, Leeming Road (the southern boundary) and Beasley Roadaccessed the area. In 1971, the suburb of Leeming was gazetted, although construction did not commence until approximately 1976, possibly as early as 1975. It was built in stages, with the area between Findlay Road and Gracechurch Crescent being built first, while the east, west and south were built in that order over the next ten years. Many of the streets were named after original landowners in the agricultural district.

Geography
Leeming is bounded by South Street to the north, Kwinana Freeway to the west, and Roe Highway to the south and southeast. The  Ken Hurst Park, a conservation bushland area beyond Roe Highway named for a former mayor of Melville (1971–73) and set aside in the early 1990s, is also within the suburb's boundaries.

At the 2001 Australian census, Leeming had a mostly upper-middle income population of 12,977 people living in 3,959 dwellings, all but 230 of which were detached houses on separate lots. About 10% of the population are of East or South-East Asian descent. Retail and property and business services are the two most common occupations.

Facilities

Educational 
Leeming contains three primary schools; Leeming (1982), West Leeming (1986) and Banksia Park (1989), and one high school, Leeming Senior High School (1985).

Commercial 
Leeming has two shopping centres:
 Leeming Shopping Forum, on the corner of Farrington and Findlay Roads, which contains a variety of small shops, an IGA supermarket, and restaurants
 Leeming Park Shopping Centre, on the corner of Beasley Road and Dundee Street

Nearby commercial services are provided by Stockland in Bull Creek on its northern fringe, and Southlands Boulevarde in Willetton.

Recreation and community
The suburb contains a family centre, a recreation centre and sports facilities ("The Rec"), the Leeming Spartan Cricket Club, the Leeming Bowling Club and the Melville Glades Golf Club.

Transport
The suburb is located next to Murdoch train station, which opened in 2007. All services are operated by the Public Transport Authority.

Politics
Leeming is a reasonably affluent suburb. Historically all three of the suburb's booths support the Liberal Party at both federal and state elections, in line with many suburbs in this region of Perth.

Pictures

References

External links
 Leeming Spartan Cricket Club
 Leeming Strikers Soccer Club
 Bullcreek Leeming Junior Football Club
 Leeming Community Group

Suburbs of Perth, Western Australia